Zhu Shouli (born 3 September 1998) is a female Chinese trampoline gymnast.

In 2018 she won the bronze medal in the women's individual event at the 2018 Asian Games held in Jakarta, Indonesia.

References

External links 
 

Living people
1998 births
Place of birth missing (living people)
Chinese female trampolinists
Gymnasts at the 2018 Asian Games
Medalists at the 2018 Asian Games
Asian Games bronze medalists for China
Asian Games medalists in gymnastics
Medalists at the Trampoline Gymnastics World Championships
21st-century Chinese women